This list of cemeteries in Arizona, listed by county, includes currently operating, pioneer, historical (closed for new interments), and defunct (graves abandoned or removed) cemeteries, columbaria, and mausolea which are historical and/or noteworthy. It does not include pet cemeteries.

Apache
 Adamanda
 Adamanda Gravesite
 Alpine
 Alpine Cemetery
 Chambers
 McCarrell Memorial Cemetery
 Chinle
 Chinle Cemetery
 Concho
 Concho Catholic Cemetery
 Erastus Cemetery
 La Culebra Ranch Cemetery
 Lopez Cemetery
 Sandoval Family Cemetery
 Ward Cemetery
 Cornfields
 Cornfields Community Cemetery
 Cottonwood
 Begay-Charley Family Cemetery
 Cove
 Cove Cemetery
 Immanuel Mission Cemetery
 Del Muerto
 Ben Family Cemetery
 Del Muerto Community Cemetery
 Tellers Acres Cemetery
 Dennehotso
 Dennehotso Community Cemetery
 Eagar
 Amity Cemetery
 Eagar Cemetery
 Snyder-Cavanaugh Burial Ground
 El Tule
 El Tule Cemetery
 Fort Defiance
 Bowman Memorial Park
 Fort Defiance Cemetery
 Good Shepherd Mission Cemetery
 Navajo Veterans Cemetery
 Rainbow Ridge Family Cemetery
 Ganado
 Ganado Community Cemetery
 Ganado Mission Cemetery (Presbyterian)
 Hubbell Hill Cemetery
 Houck
 Francis Family Cemetery
 Houck Community Cemetery
 New Houck Veteran and Community Cemetery
 Tekakwitha Catholic Mission Cemetery (named after Kateri Tekakwitha, a Catholic saint)
 Hunters Point
 Notah Family Cemetery
 Kinlichee (near Ganado)
 Kinlichee Cemetery
 Klagetoh
 Klagetoh Cemetery, a.k.a. Saint Anne Mission Cemetery
 Lukachukai
 Lukachukai Cemetery
 Lupton
 Lupton Cemetery
 Family Cemeteries in the Lupton area
 McNary
 McNary Cemeteries – North and South
 McNary Church Cemetery, a.k.a. McNary Cemetery
 Ponderosa Pine Cemetery
 Mexican Water
 Mexican Water Community Cemetery
 NaHaTa'Dzill
 NaHaTa'Dzill Cemetery
 Navajo
 Navajo Cemetery
 Navajo South Cemetery
 Nazlini
 Nazlini Cemetery
 Nutrioso
 Maxwell Family Cemetery
 Nutrioso Cemetery
 Rogers Family Cemetery
 Rufus C Williams Burial Site
 Oak Springs
 Oak Springs Cemetery
 Red Mesa
 Beulah Land Cemetery
 Red Mesa Cemetery
 Sunrise Cemetery
 Rock Point
 Rock Point Cemetery
 Rough Rock
 Rough Rock Cemetery
 Round Rock
 Roessel Family Cemetery
 Saint Johns
 East Side Cemetery
 Julianita Lopez Grave Site
 Saint Johns Catholic Cemetery
 Saint Johns Cemetery
 Saint Michaels
 Saint Michaels Cemetery
 Salido
 Salado Cemetery
 Sanders
 New Lands Cemetery
 Sanders Cemetery
 Sawmill
 Sawmill Community Cemetery
 Springerville
 Becker Family Cemetery
 Burk Cemetery
 Slaughter Family Cemetery
 Springerville Cemetery
 Springerville Cemetery Lower Section
 Springerville–Eager Cemetery
 St. Johns
 St. Johns Cemetery
 Resting place of David King Udall (1851–1938), politician and founder of the Udall family
 Levi Stewart Udall (1891–1960) and Morris King Udall (1922–1998) have cenotaphs in the cemetery
 Steamboat Canyon
 Navajo Family Burial Grounds
 Teec Nos Pos
 Teec Nos Pos Cemetery
 Tes Nez Iah
 Tes Nez Iah Cemetery
 Toyei
 Williams Family Cemetery
 Tsaile
 Begay Family Plot
 Tselani Springs
 Tselani Springs Cemetery
 Vernon
 Vernon Cemetery
 Wheatfields
 Wheatfields Cemetery
 Wide Ruins
 Mennonite Cemetery
 Wide Ruins Cemetery
 No associated community or town (includes wilderness areas)
 Black Mountain Community Cemetery
 Butler Cemetery
 Charlie Chappo Memorial Cemetery
 Damon Cemetery
 Floy Plenty Cemetery
 Goat Springs Cemetery
 Greer Cemetery
 Jumbo Family Cemetery
 Many Farms Lake Family Cemetery
 Nez Family Cemetery
 Old North Ranch Cemetery
 Old Norton Ranch
 Red Valley Community Cemetery
 Rock Head Cemetery
 Saint Isabelle Community Cemetery
 Schultz Gravesite
 Steamboat Cemetery
 Sweet Water Family Cemetery
 Tiapai Cemetery

Cochise
 Apache
 Apache Cemetery
 Poteet Cemetery
 Benson
 Circle Bar Ranch Cemetery
 Cochise Gardens of Rest Cemetery
 High Street Cemetery, a.k.a. Benson City Cemetery
 Mescal Cemetery
 Miramonte Cemetery
 San Pedro Valley UMC Columbarium
 Seventh Street Cemetery, a.k.a. Old Benson Cemetery
 Bisbee (Ghost town)
 Cochise Memory Gardens
 Don Luis Cemetery
 Evergreen Cemetery, a.k.a. Bisbee City Cemetery & Bisbee/Lowell Cemetery  (NRHP-listed)
 Hannon Family Cemetery
 Memory Gardens Cemetery
 Old Bisbee City Park Cemetery
 Bowie
 Berry Family Cemetery
 Bowie Desert Rest Cemetery
 Fort Bowie (National Historic Park, with cemetery), near Apache Pass
 Orizoba Spence, who received the Medal of Honor during the Indian Wars, is buried in the post cemetery
 Cascabel
 Cascabel Cemetery
 Gamez Cemetery
 Charleston, ghost town near the San Pedro River
 Charleston Cemetery
 Chiricahua National Monument
 Chorocahua Wilderness Memorials
 Erickson Cemetery
 Michael Keating Gravesite
 Cochise (Ghost town)
 Cochise Cemetery
 Soza Cemetery (Soza Ranch Cemetery)
 Contention City (Ghost town)
 Contention City Cemetery
 Courtland (Ghost town)
 Courtland Cemetery
 Dos Cabezas (Ghost town)
 Dos Cabezas Pioneer Cemetery
 Hudson Family Cemetery
 Hurtado Family Ranch Cemetery
 Douglas
 Calvary Cemetery, a.k.a. Douglas City Cemetery
 Calvary Memorial Park, a.k.a. Douglas Memorial Cemetery
 Douglas Cemetery
 Douglas Jewish Cemetery
 Leake Family Cemetery
 Sacred Heart Cemetery
 Tufa Cemetery
 Watson Family Ranch Cemetery
 Wells Family Cemetery
 Will Cemetery
 Dragoon
 Dragoon Springs Stage Station Site – scene of two battles during the American Civil War, has graves in the Dragoon Springs Cemetery
 Texas Canyon Pioneer Cemetery, a.k.a. Dragoon Cemetery
 Elfrida
 Elfrida Van Meter Park
 Lovelady Family Cemetery
 Whitewater Cemetery, a.k.a. Elfrida Cemetery, Whitewater Cemetery Old
 Fairbank (Ghost town)
 Escudero Ranch Cemetery
 Fairbank Cemetery
 Harkey Ranch Cemetery
 Guadalupe Spring
 Cottonwood Creek Cemetery
 Gleeson (Ghost town)
 Gleeson Cemetery
 Hilltop (Ghost town)
 Hall Ranch Cemetery
 Hilltop Cemetery
 Pinery Cemetery
 Huachuca City
 Babacomari Ranch Cemetery
 Campstone Cemetery
 James Kelly Ranch Cemetery
 West Railroad Drive Burial Ground
 Johnson
 Johnson Mine/Russellville Cemetery, a.k.a. Adams Cemetery
 Johnson Cemetery
 Kansas Settlement
 Kansas Settlement Gin Cemetery
 Lowell
 Forrest Ranch Family Cemetery
 Russellville-Dragoon Cemetery, Johnson Mine Cemetery
 Resting place of actor Robert Dix
 McNeal
 McNeal Cemetery
 Naco
 Naco Cemetery East
 Naco Cemetery North
 Kathryn Frazier (Frazier Family) cemetery
 Palominas
 Miracle Valley Cemetery, a.k.a. Allen Family Cemetery
 Paradise (Ghost town)
 Paradise Cemetery
 Paul Spur, a.k.a. Forrest
 Elisha Smith Gravesite (Member of the Mormon Battalion)
 Paul Spur Cemetery
 Pearce (Ghost town)
 Igo Ranch Family Cemetery
 Pearce Cemetery
 Burial place of Ed Drew, deputy sheriff, rancher, miner (1865–1911)
 Pressey Homestead Cemetery
 Pirtleville
 Old Pirtleville Cemetery
 Old Sacred Heart Cemetery
 Pirtleville Cemetery, a.k.a. Sacred Heart Cemetery
 Wills Cemetery
 Pomerene
 Pomerene Cemetery
 Portal
 John Edwards Hands Gravesite
 Reed Cemetery
 Round Valley Cemetery
 Ramsey
 John F. Ashworth Gravesite
 Ramsay Canyon Cemetery
 Rucker Canyon
 Rucker Cemetery
 San Simon
 Homewood Cemetery, a.k.a. San Simon Cemetery
 Railroad Cemetery
 San Simon Butterfield Station
 Sierra Vista
 Brown Canyon Cemetery
 Cochise Memory Gardens
 Faith Presbyterian Church Memorial Garden
 Fort Huachuca Post Cemetery (Tompkins Memorial Park)
 Frierson Gravesite
 Fry Pioneer Cemetery (NRHP-listed)
 Holy Hope Cemetery
 Jack F. Ashworth Gravesite
 Mother Teresa Columbarium, a.k.a. Our Lady of the Mountains Catholic Church Cemetery
 Newman Ranch Family Cemetery
 Ramsey Canyon Cemetery, a.k.a. Ramsey Pioneer Cemetery
 Ratliff Gravesites
 Saint Andrew the Apostle Memorial Garden
 Saint Stephens Episcopal Church Columbarium
 Sierra Evangelical Lutheran Church Columbarium
 Sierra Vista United Methodist Church Columbarium
 Southern Arizona Veterans Memorial Cemetery (SAVMC) – also, the Historic Cemetery of the Southern Arizona Veterans, a.k.a. Historical Soldier Memorial Cemetery is within this cemetery
 SAVMC is the resting place of clown Emmett Kelly Jr. (1924–2006)
 San Bernardino
 Slaughter Family Cemetery
 St. David
 Holy Trinity Monastery Cemetery
 Saint David Cemetery
 Resting place of writer Zenna Henderson
 Sunizona
 J. S. Potter Gravesite
 Kambitsch Cemetery
 Light Cemetery
 Morris Family Farm Burial Site
 Sanders Ranch Cemetery
 Sunnyside (Ghost town)
 Old MacNab Ranch Cemetery
 Sunnyside Pioneer Cemetery
 Tombstone
 Boothill Graveyard, Tombstone
 Boothill Cemetery Jewish Section
 Brunckow's Cabin (Ghost town) near Tombstone – scene of 1860's–1890's shootouts and where victims were buried
 Double C Family Cemetery
 Hughes Ranch Cemetery
 Presidio Santa Cruz de Terrenate Cemetery
 Tombstone City Cemetery
 Tombstone Cemetery New Addition
 Twiston
 Twiston Cemetery
 Walnut Gulch
 McClelland Gravesite Memorials
 Willcox
 Johnny Ringo State Historical Landmark
 Johnny Ringo Gravesite Cemetery
 Klump Family Ranch Cemetery
 Martin Ranch Cemetery
 Mountain Valley Mennonite Church Cemetery
 Old City Cemetery (Pioneer cemetery)
 Burial site of Warren Baxter Earp (youngest of the Earp brothers) and the outlaw Bill Downing
 Railroad Park
 Has the scattered ashes of Western cowboy movie singer Rex Allen
 Smith Carlton Family Cemetery
 Sunset Cemetery
 Resting place of  W. L. "Tay" Cook (1894–1985), Arizona politician
 Willcox Cemetery, a.k.a. Wilcox Pioneer Cemetery
 Willcox Southwest Cemetery
 No associated community or town (includes wilderness areas)
 Adling Family Cemetery
 Apodaca Cemetery
 Ash Canyon Cemetery Memorials (includes Morgan Gravesite)
 Bear Creak Cemetery
 Biederman Homestead Burial Site, a.k.a. Charles Biederman Burial Site
 Black Diamond Cemetery
 Cottonwood Cemetery
 East Whitetail Canyon gravesite
 Ed Schieffelin Gravesite
 El Dorado Cemetery, a.k.a. Neighborhood Cemetery
 Fulton Ranch Cemetery
 Hand/Lone Star Ranch Cemetery
 Herfort Hill Cemetery
 Huachuca Siding Cemetery
 John James Gidding Gravesite
 Lamar Family Cemetery
 Lone Mountain Cemetery
 Lone Mountain Ranch Cemetery
 Lone Star Mine Cemetery
 Luzena Graves
 Mesa Draw Gravesite
 Murphy-Exline Family Cemetery
 Old Leslie Ranch Cemetery, a.k.a. Old Magnolia Ranch Cemetery
 Paxton Cemetery
 Pinery Canyon Gravesites
 Riggs Family Cemetery
 Smith Gravesite
 Sonoita Gravesite
 Sulphur Springs Cemetery
 Whitehouse Ruins Grave
 Whitewater School Cemetery

Coconino
 Big Dry Wash
 Big Dry Wash Battlefield (Apache Wars) burial site
 Camp Navajo, near Bellemont
 Camp Navajo National Cemetery, a.k.a. Arizona Veterans Memorial Cemetery at Camp Navajo
 Canyon Diablo (Ghost town)
 Boot Hill Cemetery (defunct)
 Canyon Diablo Cemetery (defunct)
 Coal Mine Mesa (Ghost town)
 Coal Mine Mesa Cemetery
 Coal Mine Community Cemetery
 Cow Springs
 Cow Springs Cemetery
 Flagstaff
 Calvary Catholic Cemetery (Est. 1892)
 Citizens Cemetery
 Victims of the 1956 Grand Canyon mid-air collision are buried here
 Also buried here are:
 James W. Neilson (1909–1979) television director
 Commodore Perry Owens (1852–1919) Old West gunfighter and lawman
 Gladys Reichard (1893–1955) anthropologist and linguist
 Vesto Melvin Slipher (1875–1969) astronomer
 Episcopal Church of the Epiphany Columbarium
 Federated Community Church Columbarium
 Greenwood Cemetery (defunct)
 Lowell Observatory, Mausoleum
 Peaceful Valley Memorial Park (defunct)
 Trinity Heights United Meth. Church Columbarium
 Fredonia
 Fredonia town cemetery
 Grand Canyon
 Brant Family Gravesite
 Grand Canyon Village, gravesite of Rees B. Griffiths
 Grand Canyon Pioneer Cemetery, a.k.a. American Legion Cemetery,  South Rim Cemetery
 It is the resting place of some victims of the 1956 Grand Canyon mid-air collision (with a cenotaph of 31 names) and various other notable people associated with the Grand Canyon
 Supai (an Indian town in the canyon itself)
 Drift Fence Cemetery
 House Rock Valley
 Honeymoon Trail Gravesites
 House Rock Cemetery
 Parker Place Cemetery
 Kachina Village
 Raymond County Park
 Kaibito
 June Family Cemetery
 Lee's Ferry
 Lees Ferry Cemetery
 Lonely Dell Cemetery, Lonely Dell Ranch Historic District
 Leupp
 Cody Family Plot
 Fuson Family Plot
 Leupp Villiage Cemetery, Navajo Nation Reservation
 Moenkopi
 Old LDS Tuba City Church Cemetery (Hopi Indian Reservation)
 Page
 Page City Cemetery
 Waterhole Canyon Ranch Family Cemetery
 Parks
 Wrights Cemetery
 Rare Metals
 Rare Metals Cemetery
 Red Lake
 Navajo Nation Cemetery, a.k.a. John Daw Gravesite
 Red Lake Cemetery
 Red Mesa
 Dzillichii Cemetery
 Sedona
 Christ Lutheran Church Memorial Garden
 Church of the Red Rocks Columbarium

 Red Rock Cemetery, Sedona
 Saint Lukes Memorial Garden
 Sedona Community Cemetery
 Resting place of Raúl Héctor Castro (1916–2015) Mexican-American politician, diplomat and judge
 Sedona United Methodist Church Columbarium
 Sedona Memorial Park
 Tolani
 White Grass Family Cemetery (Navajo Indian Reservation)
 Tonales
 Tonalea Community Cemetery
 Tuba City
 Coalmine Cemetery (defunct)
 Tuba Community Cemetery
 Resting place of Lori Piestewa, the first Native American woman US Army soldier to die in combat
 Tube City Original Cemetery
 Williams
 Kaibab Forest Cemetery
 Williams Cemetery, a.k.a. Mountain View Cemetery
 No associated community or town (includes wilderness areas)
 ASC Cemetery
 Andres Moreno Gravesite
 Begay Butler Family Cemetery
 Cooks Cemetery
 I.O.O.F (Odd Fellows) Cemetery
 John Daw Grave
 Ketchum Family Plot
 Kitsillie Cemetery
 Lonely Dell Cemetery
 Mars Hill Grave
 Naatsis'aan Family Cemetery Memorials
 O'Haco Memorials
 Punkin Center Cemetery
 Táchii’nii Family Plot
 Tse Bi Wosh Giizhi

Gila
 Ceder Creek
 Jewish Memorial
 Morning Dove Cemetery
 R-14 Crossing Cemetery
 Red Hill Cemetery
 Cedar Creek Crossing
 R-14 Family Cemetery
 Central Heights
 B.P.O.E. Rest Cemetery
 Croatian Lodges Cemetery
 Pinal Cemetery
 Resting place of Pearl Hart (1871–1955) Canadian-born outlaw of the American Old West
 Serbian Cemetery
 Christmas (Ghost town)
 Christmas Cemetery
 Gisela
 Gisela Cemeteries (North and South)
 Rolan Ranch Cemetery
 Globe
 Globe Cemetery
 Resting place of Phineas Clanton (1843–1906), Old West rustler and outlaw 
 Resting place of Al Sieber (1843–1907) was a German-American U.S Civil War soldier American Old West figure
 Pinal Cemetery
 St. John's Episcopal Church Memorial Garden
 Hayden
 Mountain View Cemetery
 Haigler Creek
 Colcord Road Cemetery
 Jakes Corner/Hardt Cemetery
 Tonto Basin Cemetery
 Miami
 Mountain Breeze Memorial Gardens
 Our Lady of the Blessed Sacrament Church Cemetery
 Valley Memorial Park Cemetery
 Payson
 Annie Narrow-See (gravesite), Spring Creek
 Payson Pioneer Cemetery
 Tonto National Forest Cemetery
 Peridot
 Chinatown Cemetery
 Lower Peridot Cemetery
 Pine
 Pine Cemetery
 Punkin Center
 Cline Family Cemetery
 Murphy Ranch Cemetery
 Packard Graves Site
 Roosevelt
 Andy Lawrence Burial Site
 Annie See Gravesite
 Bacon Family Cemetery
 Roosevelt Cemetery (Roosevelt Lake) (Historic)
 Windy Hill Burial Grounds
 Round Valley, Arizona
 Mountain Meadows Memorial Gardens, a.k.a. Mountain Meadows Memorial Park and Crematory
 Rye
 Brown Family Cemetery
 Davey Gowan Burial Site
 Haught Ranch Pioneer Cemetery, a.k.a. "Last Roundup"
 San Carlos
 Dewey Family Cemetery
 Elgo Dam Cemetery
 Hilltop Cemetery
 Holy Ground Cemetery
 Northgate Cemetery
 Rice Graveyard 1880–1930
 San Carlos Apache Tribal Veterans Cemetery
 San Carlos Cemetery
 Star Valley
 Star Valley Cemetery
 Strawberry
 Strawberry Old Cemetery
 Tonto Apache Indian Reservation
 Tonto Apache Indian Reservation Cemetery
 Tonto Basin
 Greenback Ranch Cemetery
 Winkelman
 Winkelman Cemetery
 Young
 Cherry Creek Ranch Cemetery
 J Redman Gravesite
 Navajo Sheepherder Gravesite
 Middleton Ranch Graves/Cemetery, Wilson Creek
 Q Ranch Historic Cemetery
 Pleasant Valley Cemetery
 Tewksbury Family Plot
 Tewksbury-Jacobs Gravesite (Pleasant Valley War)
 Young Cemetery
 No associated community or town (includes wilderness areas)
 A-Cross Road/Windy Hill Cemetery
 Bellevue Gravesite
 Canyon Day Cemetery
 Central Heights
 Christmas Cemetery
 Conner Gravesite
 Ellison Creek – Goswick Graves
 Flying H Ranch Burial Site
 Gila River Cemetery
 Gordon Canyon Cemetery
 Goswick Family Cemetery
 H Four Cemetery
 Holder Cemetery
 Seventy-Nine (79) Mile Cemetery
 St. Paul's Episcopal Church Columbarium
 Upper Peridot Cemetery

Graham
 Artesia
 Artesia Cemetery
 Bonita
 Bonita Cemetery
 Bryce
 Bryce Cemetery
 Bylas
 Blackpoint Cemetery
 Bylas Veterans Cemetery (San Carlos Reservation)
 Middle Mesa Cemetery
 Navajo Point Cemetery
 Camp Goodwin
 Central
 Central Cemetery
 Central (Old) Cemetery
 Eden
 Eden Cemetery
 Emery
 Emery Cemetery, a.k.a. Fort Thomas Ward Cemetery, Geronimo Cemetery
 Fort Thomas
 Ashurst Cemetery
 Fort Thomas Cemetery
 Old Fort Thomas Military Cemetery
 Geronimo
 Hinton Cemetery
 Glenbar
 Glenbar Cemetery, a.k.a. Mathews Cemetery
 Graham
 Graham County Cemetery
 Klondyke
 Aravaipa Canyon Cemetery
 Deer Creek Cemetery
 Klondyke Cemetery
 Pima
 Old Pima Cemetery
 Pima Cemetery
 Tripp Canyon Burial Site
 Safford City
 Brenner Cemetery
 Gila Valley Memorial Gardens, a.k.a. Rest Haven Cemetery
 Lebanon Cemetery
 Safford City Cemetery, a.k.a. Safford Union Cemetery, Union Cemetery
 Saint Paisius Orthodox Monastery Cemetery
 San Jose
 Garcia Family Cemetery
 Molina Farm Cemetery
 San Jose Cemetery
 Sanchez
 Earven Family Cemetery
 Sanchez Cemetery
 Serna Family Cemetery
 Solomon
 Epley Cemetery
 Solomon Cemetery
 Sunset
 Bell Cemetery
 Mountain View Cemetery, a.k.a. Wear Family Cemetery
 Thatcher
 Hubbard Cemetery
 Thatcher Cemetery
 Whitlock Cienega
 Posey Homestead Burial Site
 No associated community or town (includes wilderness areas)
 Ash Peak Cemetery
 Black Hills Byway Burial Site
 Cedar Springs Butte Cemetery
 Cooley Mountain – Annie-See Remote Grave Cemetery
 Corporal Charles E Elward Gravesite Memorials
 Johns Cemetery
 Johnson Cemetery (Cedar Springs)
 Kennedy Family Cemetery
 Lindsey Grave
 Matthewsville Cemetery
 McEuen Cemetery
 Rogers Cemetery
 Salazar Cemetery
 Whalen Cemetery

Greenlee
 Blue
 Blue Cemetery
 Blue River Gravesites
 Lanphier Ranch Cemetery
 Clifton
 Clifton Cemeteries (one and two)
 Double Circle Ranch and Pioneer Cemetery, Eagle Greek, Clifton
 Metcalf Cemetery
 Duncan
 Duncan Valley Cemetery
 Herrara-Trujillo Family Cemetery
 Sacred Heart Cemetery
 Sacred Heart Church Columbarium
 Sanders Family Cemetery
 Sheldon Cemetery
 Franklin
 Franklin Cemetery
 Morenci
 Bunker Cemetery
 Old Morenci Mexicano Cemetery
 Various old Catholic and mine cemeteries
 Sheldon
 Sheldon Cemetery
 York
 Yorks Ranch Cemetery
 No associated community or town (includes wilderness areas)
 Ash Peak Trading Post gravesite
 Bat Canyon Grave North
 Bat Canyon Grave South
 Blue Cemetery
 Charles Allen Hamblin Gravesite
 Coronado Spring graves
 Double Circle Ranch Cemetery
 Eagle Creek Graves
 Fritz Gravesite
 Guthrie Cemetery
 Hot Springs Cemetery
 Jones Cemetery
 Metcalf Cemetery
 Metcalf Indian Cemetery
 Old Duncan Cemetery
 Sacred Heart Catholic Cemetery
 Stergo Cemetery
 Swafford Gravesite
 Ward Canyon Cemetery
 Ward Family Cemetery

La Paz
 Bouse (Ghost town)
 Bouse Cemetery – remnants of graves
 Cibola
 Bishop Family Cemetery
 Cibola Cemetery – remnants of graves
 Swain Farm Cemetery
 Ehrenberg
 Ehrenberg Cemetery
 La Paz Cemetery
 Parker
 Colorado River Indian Tribes Cemetery (CRIT)
 Parker Cemetery
 Poston
 Poston War Relocation Center Cemetery
 Quartzsite
 Hi Jolly Monument
 Salome
 Brown Family Cemetery
 Cullings Well Cemetery
 Dick Wick Hall grave (founder of Salome)
 Jacobs & Bedford Gravesite
 Swamsea (Ghost town)
 Alamo Crossing Cemeteries (East & West)
 Lopez Ranch Cemetery, Bill Williams River
 White Hills
 Pioneer Cemetery
 Swansea North Cemeteries (North & Couth)
 Vicksburg
 Vicksburg Cemetery
 Vicksburg Gravesite (Willie Stutts)
 Wendon
 Fass Family Cemetery
 Olea Ranch Cemetery, Alamo Lake (a.k.a. Three Rivers Ranch)
 Wenden Cemetery
 No associated community or town (includes wilderness areas)
 Clip Mine Cemetery
 Cullings Well – former stagecoach stop with a nearby cemetery
 Graves in the Dome Rock Mountains near Quartzsite
 Harrisburg Cemetery
 Hoge Ranch Gravesite
 Kofa Cemetery
 Nommel Place (site)
 Norton's Landing
 Planet Mine Cemetery
 Red Cloud Mine
 Utting Gravesite

Maricopa
 Agua Caliente (Ghost town)
 Agua Caliente Cemetery
 Aguila
 Eagle Eye Cemetery
 Tom Walder Memorial Park
 Ahwatukee
 Mountain View Lutheran Church Columbarium
 Bosque Cemetery
 Fort McDowell
 Fort McDowell Yavapai Nation Ba Dah Mod Jo Cemetery
 Gila Bend
 Hee-A-Han Park
 Pioneer Cemetery
 Stout Cemetery
 Phoenix metropolitan area
 Phoenix – state capital and largest city
 All Saints Close at All Saints Episcopal Church (Est. 1976)
 All Saints Lutheran Memorial Garden Columbarium
 Arizona State Hospital, a.k.a. All Souls Cemetery, Phoenix & Asylum Cemetery (1888–1960s)
 Held the remains of Isaiah Mays, Medal of Honor recipient, who was later re-interred at Arlington National Cemetery
 Beth Israel Cemetery, includes Beth Hebrew Cemetery (Est. ) and Workmans Circle Cemetery
 Resting place for hotel manager and gangster Gus Greenbaum
 Cementerio Lindo, a.k.a. Salt River Cemetery (1890–1952)
 Church of the Beatitudes Columbarium
 Cross Cut Cemetery, a.k.a. Williams-Crosscut Cemetery & Cactus Mound Cemetery (1884–1947)
 Encanto Community Church Memorial Garden
 Faith Lutheran Church Columbarium
 First United Methodist Church Columbarium
 Greenwood/Memory Lawn Mortuary & Cemetery
 Resting place of Oscar P. Austin and Andrew J. Weaher, recipients of the Medal of Honor
 Also, there are 20 known Confederate Army soldiers buried in Greenwood
 Greenwood Cemetery – Beth El Section (Est. )
 Hansen Desert Hills Cemetery (Est. 1977)
 Holy Redeemer Catholic Cemetery (Est. 2000)
 Resting place for cartoonist Bil Keane
 Mt. Sinai Cemetery
 Resting place of marketing executive Barry Bremen
 Mater Misericordiae Catholic Church
 National Memorial Cemetery of Arizona – Resting place for a variety of notable people
 Orangewood Presbyterian Church Memorial Gardens
 Papago Park – Hunt's Tomb Cemetery
 Phoenix Memorial Park & Mortuary (Est. 1962)
 Resting place of musician Al Casey
 Pioneer and Military Memorial Park (1871)
 Contains the following cemeteries:
 Ancient Order of United Workmen Cemetery (K.of.P. & A.O.U.W. section (1889–1914)
 City Loosley Cemetery (1887–1914)
 Independent Order of Odd Fellows Cemetery (I.O.O.F. section) (1884–1914)
 Knights of Pythias Cemetery (K.of.P. & A.O.U.W. section) (1884–1914)
 Masons Cemetery, a.k.a. Masonic Cemetery (1884–1914)
 Porter Cemetery (1887–1914)
 Rosedale Cemetery
 Resting place of Territorial Governor Benjamin Joseph Franklin
 Pioneer Living History Museum – has a western cemetery replica
 Prince of Peace Lutheran Church Columbarium
 Resthaven Park Cemetery (East)
 Resting place of football player Art Malone
 Shadow Rock Congregational Church Cemetery
 Shepherd of the Hills UCC Memorial Garden
 Shepherd of the Valley Lutheran Church
 Shepherd of the Valley United Methodist Church
 Sotelo-Heard Cemetery, a.k.a. Heard Ranch Cemetery, Sotelo-Heard Ranch Cemetery, Across the River Cemetery & Mexican Cemetery – once a large cemetery, now abandoned
 Stanfield Potters Field Cemetery
 St. Francis Catholic Cemetery (Est. 1897)
 St. Mary's Episcopal Church Cemetery
 St. Stephen's Catholic Church and Columbarium (EST. 1968)
 Trinity Episcopal Cathedral Columbarium
 Trinity Lutheran Church Columbarium
 Trinity United Methodist Church Memorial Garden
 North Valley

 Carefree
 Christ Anglican Church Columbarium
 Christ the Lord Lutheran Church Columbarium
 Cave Creek
 Boot Hill Cemetery
 Cave Creek Memorial Arena Cemetery
 East Valley

 Chandler
 Calvary Lutheran Church Columbarium
 Goodyear–Ocotillo Cemetery (1920–1962)
 Holy Trinity Lutheran Church Memory Gardens
 Risen Savior Lutheran Church Columbarium
 Saint Matthew’s Episcopal Church Memorial Garden
 Valley of the Sun Memorial Park Cemetery, a.k.a. Gardens of Peace Cemetery (Dignity Memorial)

 Fountain Hills
 Christ's Church of Fountain Hills Columbarium
 Fountain Hills Presbyterian Church Columbarium
 Shepherd of the Hills Lutheran Church Columbarium
 The Fountains Memorial Garden and Columbarium
 Trinity Lutheran Church Columbarium

 Guadalupe (Tempe)
 Guadalupe Cemetery (Est. )
 Mesa
 Apache Wells Community Church Columbarium
 Church of the Transfiguration Columbarium
 City of Mesa Cemetery (Est. 1891)
 Resting place of John Jacob Rhodes Jr. (1916–2003) lawyer and politician
 Desert Haven Columbarium, a.k.a. Red Mountain UMC Desert Haven Columbarium
 First Evangelical Lutheran Church Memorial Garden
 First Presbyterian Church of Mesa Columbarium
 First United Methodist Church of Mesa Columbarium
 Love of Christ Lutheran Church Columbarium
 Mariposa Gardens Memorial Park Cemetery
 Mountain View Funeral Home and Cemetery (Est. 1952)
 Resting place of Manuel V. Mendoza, posthumous recipient of the Medal of Honor
 Presbyterian Church of the Master Columbarium
 Queen of Heaven Catholic Cemetery (Est. 1978) 
 Resting place of Darell Garretson, MLB Referee
 Resting place of Bob Kennedy, MLB Player & Manager
 Saint Marks Episcopal Church Columbarium
 Velda Rose Garden
 Victory Lutheran Church Memorial Garden
 Paradise
 Ascension Lutheran Church Memorial Garden
 Camelback Cemetery, a.k.a. Old Scottsdale Cemetery, Scottsdale Cemetery (Est. 1916)
 Christ Church of the Ascension Memory Garden
 Resting place of Barry Goldwater (1909–1998) Senator and presidential candidate and Hugh Downs (1921–2020) newsman
 Paradise Valley Methodist Church Columbarium
 Saint Barnabas on the Desert Memorial Garden
 Unitarian Universalist Congregation of Phoenix
 Valley Presbyterian Church Memorial Garden
 Queen Creek
 San Tan Memorial Gardens Cemetery
 Rio Verde
 Rio Verde Memorial Gardens, Community Church of the Verdes
 Scottsdale
 Alcor Life Extension Foundation (Est. 1972)
 Chaparral Christian Church Memorial Garden (The Commons on Shea)
 Desert Foothills Lutheran Church Memorial Garden
 Desert Hills Presbyterian Church Memorial Garden
 Green Acres Mortuary & Cemetery (Est. 1957)
 Hansens Desert Hills Memorial Park and Mortuary, a.k.a. Desert Hills Memorial Park Cemetery
 La Casa de Cristo Lutheran Church Memorial Garden
 Living Water Lutheran Church Columbarium
 Mountain View Presbyterian Church Memorial Garden
 North Scottsdale UMC Memorial Garden
 Paradise Memorial Gardens Cemetery
 Pinnacle Presbyterian Church Memorial Garden
 Saint Anthony on the Desert Church Columbarium
 Scottsdale United Methodist Church Memorial Garden
 Taliesin West Burial Site
 Original burial site of Frank Lloyd Wright and Olgivanna Lloyd Wright
 Tempe
 Desert Cross Lutheran Church Columbarium
 Desert Palm United Church of Christ Columbarium
 Dorman Ranch Cemetery
 Double Butte Cemetery, a.k.a. Tempe Double Butte Cemetery, Double Butte Cemetery, Tempe Cemetery (NRHP-listed) – has many notable burials (Est. 1884)
 Episcopal Church of the Epiphany Columbarium
 First United Methodist Church Memorial Garden
 Gethsemane Lutheran Church Memorial Garden
 Mission del Sol Presbyterian Church Columbarium
 Petersen Park
 Reaves Family Cemetery
 Saint Augustines Episcopal Church Columbarium
 Saint James Episcopal Church Memorial Garden
 Twin Buttes Cemetery, a.k.a. Potter's field (1952–1994) (Maricopa County managed)
 University Presbyterian Church Memorial Garden

 Sun Lakes
 Sun Lakes Methodist Church Columbarium (Est. 1991)
 West Valley
 Avondale
 Goodyear Farms Historic Cemetery
 Holy Cross Cemetery (Est. 1964)
 Buckeye
 Buckeye Cemetery
 Louis B Hazelton Cemetery (Est. 1938)
 Palo Verde Cemetery
 El Mirage
 Heath Grave
 Sunwest Cemetery & Crematorium
 Glendale
 Arrowhead Memorial Gardens & Mortuary of Joy  (Est. 1999)
 Cemetery of Spiritual Christians from Russia
 Glendale Memorial Park Cemetery (Est. 1895)
 Resting place of José F. Jiménez, recipient of the Medal of Honor
 Resthaven Park Cemetery, Glendale (West)
 Resting place of Silvestre S. Herrera, recipient of the Medal of Honor
 Russian Spiritual Christians Cemetery, a.k.a. Molokan Cemetery
 Trinity Mennonite Church Columbarium
 Goodyear
 Christ Presbyterian Church Columbarium
 Snaketown Cemetery
 White Tanks Cemetery (Maricopa County Cemetery) (Est. 1994)
 Litchfield
 Church at Litchfield Park Garden of Memories
 Saint Peters Episcopal Church Columbarium
 Palo Verde
 Palo Verde Baptist Church Cemetery (Est. 1903)
 Peoria
 Johnny Osuna Memorial Park Cemetery
 Sun City – includes Sun City, Sun City West, Sun City Grand
 Sunland Memorial Park & Mortuary
 Surprise
 Mission Home Cemetery
 The Cemetery Club

 Harqua Hala (Ghost town)
 Harquahala Cemetery
 Harquahala Mine Cemetery
 Heber-Overgaard
 Heber-Overgaard Cemetery
 Kaka
 New Kaka Cemetery
 Lehi (Mesa)
 Lehi Cemetery (Est. 1913) Salt River, Maricopa Pima Indian Community
 Liberty (Buckeye)
 Liberty Cemetery (1892–1962)
 Maricopa Village
 Co-op Cemetery
 Mobile
 Galilee Baptist Church Cemetery, a.k.a. Mobile Cemetery
 Morristown
 Morristown Cemetery
 Palm Lake Cemetery
 Oatman, Arizona (Ghost town)
 Oatman Massacre Cemetery and Four Ranch Cemetery
 Rio Verde
 St. Francis of Assisi Catholic Church Cemetery
 San Domingo Wash
 San Domingo Wash gravesites
 San Lucy Village
 San Lucy Cemetery
 Vulture City
 Vulture City Cemeteries
 Vulture City Pioneer Cemetery, a.k.a. Verde Flat Cemetery
 Vulture Mine graves (scattered on mine property
 Weedville (Glendale)
 Weedville Cemetery, a.k.a. Old Paths Cemetery (Est. 1921)
 Wickenburg has various cemeteries and burial sites, including:
 Boetto House Cemetery (George Gibbs Memorial)
 Brill Branch Cemetery, a.k.a. Martin Family Gravesite, Hassayampa River Preserve
 Flying E Ranch – Graves
 Garcia Cemetery (a.k.a. Old Garcia Cemetery) (Est. 1863)
 Henry Wickenburg Pioneer Cemetery, NRHP-listed in Maricopa County
 Morristown Cemetery
 Old Lumber Yard Cemetery
 Old Wickenburg Pioneer Cemetery
 St. Alban's Episcopal Church – Memorial Garden
 St. Anthony de Padua Catholic Church – Columbarium
 Sols Wash – Burial Ground/Cemetery
 Stone Park Cemetery
 Wickenburg Municipal Cemetery (Est. 1931)
 Resting place of Maynard L. Taylor Jr. (1917–1992) Mayor of Anchorage, Alaska
 Wittmann
 Wittman Cemetery
 No associated community or town (includes wilderness areas)
 Al Rahma Muslim Cemetery
 Bixby Cemetery
 Brunner Ranch Cemetery
 Camino del Sol Memorial Columbarium Cemetery
 Crown of Life Lutheran Church Columbarium Cemetery
 Hieroglyphic Mountains Grave
 Piedra Cemetery
 Richardson/Fierra Homestead Cemetery
 Thompson Cemetery, a.k.a. Sleeping Bride Cemetery
 Wamsley Cemetery

Mohave
 Beaver Dam
 Beaver Dam Cemetery
 Bill Williams River National Wildlife Refuge
 Esquerra Ranch Cemetery
 Buck Mountains
 Yucca Mine Graves
  Bullhead City
 Fort Mojave Post Cemetery
 Hardyville Cemetery (NRHP-listed)
 Wisniewski Family Grave
 Cane Beds
 Black Family Cemetery
 Cox Family Cemetery, a.k.a. Cane Beds Cemetery
 Dutson Family Cemetery
 Finicum Family Cemetery
 J W Black Memorial Cemetery
 LeBaron Family Cemetery
 Spur Ranch Cemetery
 Cedar
 Cedar Cemetery
 Centennial Park
 Centennial Park Cemetery
 Terra Verde Memorial Gardens
 Cerbat (Ghost town)
 Cerbat cemetery
 Chloride (Ghost town)
 Chloride cemetery, a.k.a. Silver Hill Cemetery
 Chloride gravesite nearby
 Colorado
 Cane Beds Cemetery
 Hammon Cemetery
 Isaac W. Carling Memorial Park
 Short Creek Cemetery
 Fort Mohave
 Fort Mohave Cemetery
 Mohave Valley Cemetery
 Franconia
 Franconia Cemetery
 Golconda (Mine and ghost town)
 Golconda Cemetery
 Goldroad (Ghost town)
 Goldroad Cemetery (near Oatman)
 Hackberry
 Hackberry Cemetery, a.k.a. The Willows Cemetery
 Kaibab
 Kaibab Paiute Tribe Cemetery
 Kingman
 Camp Beale Springs Cemetery
 Grace Lutheran Church Columbarium and Memorial Garden
 Mountain View Cemetery
 Resting place of George Farley "Boots" Grantham (1900–1954) MLB second baseman
 Pioneer Cemetery
 Lake Havasu City
 Community Presbyterian Church Columbarium
 Grace Episcopal Memorial Garden
 Lake Havasu Memorial Gardens
 McCormies Family Cemetery
 Mount Olive Lutheran Church Columbarium
 Litchfield
 Littlefield Cemetery
 Mineral Park (Ghost town)
 Mineral Park Cemetery
 Moccasin
 Moccasin Cemetery
 Mohave Valley
 Desert Lawn Funeral Home, Crematory, and Memorial Park
 Resting place of Suzanne Crough (1963–2015) child actress
 Mount Trumbull
 Mount Trumbull Cemetery
 William H. Noakes Gravesite
 Oatman (Ghost town)
 Gold Road Cemetery
 Oatman Cemetery
 Peach Springs
 McGee Family Cemetery
 Peach Springs Cemetery
 Peach Springs Indian Burial Ground
 Penn's Valley
 Snyder Family Cemetery
 Signal (Ghost town)
 Palmerita Ranch Fass-Valensuela Family Cemetery (gravesites)
 Signal cemetery/gravesite (intact)
 Signal Chinese Gravesite
 Signal Mexican Cemetery
 Sunshine Ridge
 Hancock Family Cemetery
 Tuweep (Ghost town)
 Riffey Burial Site
 Valentine
 Valentine Cemetery
 Valentine Indian Cemetery
 White Hills (Ghost town)
 White Hills Cemetery
 Wikieup
 Davis Ranch Cemetery
 Masten Family Cemetery
 Noli Cemetery (Noli gravesites)
 Sandy Cemetery
 Wikieup Indian Cemetery
 Wikieup Mexican Cemetery
 Yucca
 Lopez Ranch Cemetery
 Yucca Cemetery
 No associated community or town (includes wilderness areas)
 Banegas Ranch Cemetery
 Big Sandy Cemetery
 Burned Mill Cemetery
 Carrow/Stephens Ranch Cemetery
 Democrat Mine Grave
 Frees Wash Graves
 Gold Basin Cemetery
 Horse Valley Ranch Cemetery
 Lord Property
 Meadow Cemetery
 Rojas Cemetery
 Sandy Valley Gravesites
 Swansea Pumping Station Site Cemetery
 Stevens Ranch Cemetery
 Van Marter Cemetery

Navajo
 Aripine
 Grant Roadside Grave
 Bacavi
 Bacavi Community Cemetery
 Cedar Springs
 Cedar Springs Cemetery
 Chilchinbeto
 Chilchinbito Community Cemetery, Navajo Nation
 Cibecue
 Cibecue Northwest Cemetery (White Mountain Apache Tribe Reservation}
 Evergreen Cemetery
 Forestdale Cemetery (White Mountain Apache Tribe Reservation}
 Mountain Shadow Cemetery (White Mountain Apache Tribe Reservation}
 Nachu Family Cemetery
 Open Range Cemetery  (White Mountain Apache Tribe Reservation}
 Red Mountain Ridge Cemetery
 Salt Creek Cemetery (White Mountain Apache Tribe Reservation}
 Sandy Rock Cemetery
 Sunnyside Cemetery (White Mountain Apache Tribe Reservation}
 Sunset Cemetery (White Mountain Apache Tribe Reservation}
 Clay Springs
 Clay Springs Cemetery
 Perkins Family Cemetery
 Smith Family Ranch Cemetery
 Dilkon
 Dilkon Community Cemetery (Navajo Nation Reservation)
 Long Family Cemetery
 East Fork
 Bush Flat Cemetery, a.k.a Dove Road Cemetery (Fort Apache Reservation of the White Mountain Apaches)
 Manzanita Cemetery (Fort Apache Reservation of the White Mountain Apaches)
 Mission View Cemetery (White Mountain Apache Indian Reservation)
 Greasewood
 Greasewood Community Cemetery
 Lower Greasewood Cemetery
 Hard Rocks
 Hard Rock Cemetery, a.k.a Hard Rock Mission Church Cemetery
 Heber
 Baca Family Cemetery
 Baca Ranch and Baca Cemeteries (one and two)
 Hangman Trail Burial Ground
 Heber Cemetery
 Micki burial site
 Yates Family Walnut Ranch Cemetery
 Holbrook
 Geronimo/Kempton
 H-Y Ranch Family Cemetery
 Holbrook Cemeteries (north and south)
 Resting place of Don Taylor Udall (1897–1976) politician
 Seventh Day Adventist Mission Cemetery
 Indian Wells
 Indian Wells Community Cemetery
 Jeddito
 Jeddito Community Cemetery
 Joseph City
 Hunt Family Cemetery
 Joseph City Cemetery
 Kempton Gravesite
 Kayenta
 Grey Point Family Burial Site
 Kayenta Community Cemetery
 Oakridge Cemetery
 Wetherill Cemetery
 Keams Canyon
 Keams Canyon Community Cemetery
 Kykotsmovi
 Kykotsmovi Village Cemetery
 Lake of the Woods
 Lakeside Cemetery
 Linden
 Frost Family Cemetery
 North Fork
 Chiefton Cemetery (White Mountain Apache Tribe Reservation)
 Oraibi
 Oraibi Village Cemetery (Hopi Tribe Reservation)
 Overgaard
 Overgaard Baby Cemetery
 Pinedale
 Pinedale Cemetery
 Pinetop-Lakeside
 Episcopal Church Of Our Saviour Columbarium
 Lakeside Cemetery
 Phipps Grave
 Pinetop Cemetery
 Saint Marys Angels Rest Columbarium, a.k.a. Saint Mary of the Angels Church Columbarium
 Pinon
 Pinon Cemetery
 Whippoorwill Community Cemetery
 Polacca
 Tewa Cemetery, a.k.a. First Mesa Cemetery, Polacca Tewa Cemetery
 Tootsie Family Cemetery
 Second Mesa
 Shungopavi Cemetery (Hopi Tribe Reservation)
 Sipaulovi Cemetery (Hopi Tribe Reservation)
 Shonto
 Shonto Cemetery, a.k.a. Cowsprings Cemetery
 Show Low
 Adair Cemetery
 Conklin Gravesite
 Golden Gorge Family Cemetery
 R. V. "Mike" Ramsey Memorial Cemetery
 Show Low Cemetery
 Shumway
 Love Lake Ranch Cemetery
 Shumway Pioneer Cemetery
 Silver Creek
 Silver Creek Cemetery
 Snowflake
 R V Mike Ramsay Memorial Cemetery, a.k.a. Also known as Snowflake Cemetery
 Sunset
 Pioneer Cemetery, Homolovi Ruins State Park, near Winslow
 Taylor
 Taylor Cemetery, a.k.a. Reed S. Hatch Memorial Cemetery
 Whiteriver
 Bush Flat Cemetery
 Fort Apache Indian Reservation
 Resting place of William Alchesay, recipient of the Medal of Honor
 Seven Mile Cemetery
 Whiteriver Cemetery (White Mountain Apache Indian Reservation)
 Winslow
 Birdsprings Community Cemetery
 Brigham City Cemetery, a.k.a. Ballengers Camp Cemetery
 Desert View Cemetery
 Round Cedar Cemetery
 Sunset Cemetery, a.k.a. LDS Pioneer Cemetery, Mormon Pioneer Cemetery
 Whipple Memorial Park
 Winslow (Navajo) Cemetery
 Winslow Desert View Cemetery
 Winslow Indian Sanatorium Cemetery
 Woodruff
 Woodruff City Cemetery
 No associated community or town (includes wilderness areas)
 Ahshii Hii Family Plot
 Baird Family Cemetery
 Black Mesa Cemetery
 Burton Cemetery
 Cedar Shade Family Cemetery
 Chief Alchesay Baha Grave, Alchesay Flat
 Chiefton Alchesay Cemetery
 Cooley Mountain Cemetery, a.k.a. Cooley Family Cemetery
 Elephant Butte Family Plot
 Family Cemetery
 Hill Top Cemetery
 Hotevilla Cemetery
 McCamant-McCauley Family Cemetery (West Chevelon Canyon)
 Oljato-Monument Valley Cemetery
 Running Water Cemetery
 Sevenmile Cemetery (White Mountain Apache Indian Reservation)
 Stott, Scott & Wilson Cemetery
 Smoke Signal Family Cemetery
 Solid Rock Cemetery
 Spires Family Cemetery
 Taipa Cemetery
 Whipple Memorial Park

Pima
 Ajo
 Ajo Cemetery
 Ajo Peak Cemetery
 Childs Cemetery, a.k.a. Ten Mile Ranch Cemetery
 Darby Wells Cemetery
 Quitobaquito Cemetery, a.k.a. Organ Pipe Burials (Organ Pipe Cactus National Monument)
 Stua Bidag Cemetery
 Ak Chin
 Ak Chin Cemetery
 Ali Ak Chin
 Menagers Dam Cemetery
 Ali Molina
 Little Tucson Cemetery
 Arivaca (Ghost town)
 Arivaca Cemetery
 Moyza Ranch Road Cemetery
 Palo Alto Ranch Cemetery
 Arivaca Junction
 Arivaca Junction Cemetery
 Catalina
 Mountain Shadows Presbyterian Church Memorial Garden
 Chico Shunie
 Chico Shunie Ranch Cemetery
 Chiuli Shaik
 Fresnal Canyon Cemetery (Tohono O'odham Nation Reservation)
 Choulic
 Choulic Village Cemetery (Tohono O'odham Indian Reservation)
 Continental
 Continental Cemetery
 Cortaro
 Rillito Ranch Cemetery, a.k.a. Cortaro Cemetery
 Cowlic
 Cowlic Cemetery
 Eagle Creek
 Eagle Creek Cemetery
 Emika
 Emika Cemetery (Tohono O'Odham Nation Reservation)
 Fort Lowell (Tucson, Arizona)
 Camp Lowell Post Cemetery (defunct)
 Fort Lowell Post Cemetery (1881–1891)
 Fort Lowell Cemetery (actively receiving burials)
 Galleta Flat
 White Cross Cemetery
 Gilbert
 Gilbert Memorial Park
 Greaterville (Ghost town)
 Greaterville Cemetery – not maintained
 Green Valley
 Desert Hills Lutheran Church Columbarium
 La Posada Columbarium – La Posada Central Park
 Lutheran Church of the Risen Savior Columbarium
 McGee Ranch Cemetery
 Morales Family Cemetery
 Nelson Sawyer Cemetery
 Saint Francis Episcopal Church Memorial Garden
 Saint Francis-in-the-Valley Episcopal Church Columbarium
 United Methodist Church of Green Valley Memorial Garden
 Valley Presbyterian Church Columbarium
 Gu Vo
 Gu-Vo Village Cemetery (Tohono O'odham Indian Reservation)
 Haivana Nakya
 Haivana Nakya Cemetery (Crow Hanging Village, a.k.a. Crow Hang Village)
 Helvetia (Ghost town)
 Helvetia Cemetery
 Hickiwan
 Hickiwan Cemetery (Tohono O'Odham Nation Reservation)
 Maish Vaya
 Maish Vaya Village Cemetery (Tohono O'odham Reservation)
 Marana
 Arizona Veterans' Memorial Cemetery, Arizona Department of Veterans' Services
 Maintains a cenotaph for Indian Wars Medal of Honor recipients Blanquet, Chiquito, Elsatsoosu,  Jim, Kelsay, Kosoha, Machol, Nantaje, and Nannasaddie
 Child actor and later US Army officer Don Marion Davis (1917–2020) also buried there 
 Marana Mortuary and Cemetery
 Nolic
 Nolic Cemetery
 Oro Valley
 Church of the Apostles Cemetery
 Oro Valley United Church of Christ Memorial Garden
 Resurrection Lutheran Church Memorial Garden
 Pantano
 Historic railroad station with cemetery nearby
 Pisinemo
 Pisinemo Village Cemetery (Tohono O'odham Nation Reservation)
 Redington
 Bayless Ranch Cemetery, a.k.a. Ronquillo Family Cemetery
 Rincon Creek
 Rincon Creek Grave
 Sahurita
 Good Shepherd United Church of Christ Columbarium
 Green Valley Cemetery
 Resting place of William Luce (1931–2019) stage and television writer and Pat Welsh (1915–1995) actress
 Kilgore Family Cemetery
 San Miguel
 San Miguel Cemetery
 Santa Rosa
 Castillo Family Cemetery
 Sasabe
 Garcia Ranch Cemetery
 Schuchuli
 Gunsight Cemetery (Tohono O'Odham Nation Reservation)
 Sells
 Big Fields Cemetery
 Coldfields Cemetery
 Comely Cemetery
 Crow Hang Cemetery
 Iron Pipe Cemetery
 North Komelik Village Cemetery (Tohono O'odham Indian Reservation)
 Papago Baptist Church Cemetery
 Presbyterian Cemetery
 Red Well Cemetery
 Saint Simon Cemetery (Tohono O'odham Reservation)
 Sells Cemetery (Tohono O'odham Nation Reservation)
 Sikul Himatk
 Sikul Himatk Cemetery
 Sil Nakya
 Sil Nakya Cemetery
 Silver Bell
 Silverbell Cemeteries (Center and South)
 South Komelik
 South Komelik Cemetery
 Stoa Pitk
 Stoa Pitk Cemetery
 Tanque Verde
 Tanque Verde Cemetery
 Three Points
 King's Rendondo Memorial
 Total Wreck (Ghost town)
 Total Wreck Cemetery
 Topawa
 Komlic Cemetery
 St. Catherine's Mission cemetery
 Topawa Villiage Cemetery (Tohono O'odham Indian Reservation)
 Tucson
 Aguilar Ranch Cemetery
 Alameda-Stone Cemetery, a.k.a. National Cemetery (1860–1875)
 All Faiths Memorial Park, a.k.a. Desert Vista Community Cemetery, Islamic Cemetery, Our Lady of the Desert Cemetery, Queen of all Saints Mausoleum, Shaarei Shalom Cemetery
 Ascension Lutheran Church Memorial Garden
 Beautiful Savior Lutheran Church Memorial Garden
 Binghampton Cemetery, a.k.a. Old Pioneer LDS Cemetery
 Casa Adobes Congregational Church Columbarium
 Catalina United Methodist Church Memorial Garden
 Cathedral of Saint Augustine Altar Crypt
 Children's Memorial Park at Michael Perry Park
 Children's Memorial Park at Rillito River Park
 Christ Church United Methodist Memorial Garden (no burials)
 Christ Presbyterian Church Memorial Garden (no burials)
 Christ the King Episcopal Church Columbarium
 Congregation Bet Shalom Cemetery
 Court Street Cemetery, a.k.a. Tucson City Cemetery (1875–1909)
 Degrazia Gallery – burial site of artist Ettore "Ted" DeGrazia (1909–1982)
 Dove of Peace Lutheran Church Memorial Garden
 East Lawn Palms Cemetery and Mortuary, a.k.a. Grantwood Memorial Park, Tucson Memorial Park East Lawn, Woodlawn Cemetery (Dignity Memorial)
 Resting place of the following:
 Jimmy Dudley (1909–1999) – Sports Broadcaster
 Chris Duncan (1981–2019) – Mayor League Baseball Player
 Fred W. Enke (1924–2014) – Professional Football Player
 William Freyse (1898–1969) – Cartoonist
 Jerry Kindall (1935–2017) – Major League Baseball Player
 Hank Leiber (1911–1993) Major League Baseball Player
 Mitzi Mayfair (1914–1976) –Broadway tap-dancer and actress
 Alexander Smallens (1889–1972) – Conductor
 Harold Francis Youngblood (1907–1983) – US Congressman
 Evergreen Memorial Park
 Resting place of the following:
 Arthur Olaf Andersen (1880–1958) – Songwriter, music educator and administrator
 Billy Breakenridge (1846–1931) – Western lawman
 Lou Criger (1872–1934) – Major League Baseball Player
 Andrew Ellicott Douglass (1867–1962) – Scientist
 Dan Edward Garvey (1886–1974) Arizona Governor (1948–1951)
 Margie Greenough Henson (1908–2004) – Entertainer, cowgirl and rodeo performer
 Louis Cameron Hughes (1842–1915) – Governor of Arizona Territory
Thomas Jefferson Jeffords (1832–1914) – Frontiersman, scout, and Indian Agent
 Alice Greenough Orr (1902–1995) – Entertainer, cowgirl, and world rodeo champion
 Larcena Pennington Page (1837–1913) – Western folk heroine
 Eddie Peabody (1902–1970) – Musician
 Charles A. Shibell (1841–1908) – Western Lawman
 Hiram Sanford Stevens (1832–1893) – US Congressman
 Frank C. Stilwell (1855–1882) – Wild West Figure
 Charles Arnette Towne (1858–1928) – US Congressman and Senator
 First United Methodist Church Memorial Garden
 Fountain of Life Lutheran Church Columbarium
 Grace Saint Pauls Memorial Garden
 Hebrew Cemetery
 Holy Hope Cemetery and Mausoleum
 Resting place of the following:
 John Harris Behan (1845–1912) – Western lawman
 Joseph Bonanno (1905–2002) – Organized crime figure
 James Francis McNulty (1925–2009) – US Congressman
 John J. Mitchell (Medal of Honor) (1846–1898) – Recipient of the Medal of Honor during the Indian Wars
 Humphrey Family Cemetery
 Immanuel Presbyterian Church Memorial Garden
 Los Reales Cemetery
 Lutheran Church of the Foothills Memorial Garden
 Mission San Xavier del Bac Mausoleum
 Monte Calvario Cemetery, a.k.a. New Pascua Yaqui Cemetery (Pascua Yaqui Tribe and Veteran Affairs funded)
 Moreno Ranch Cemetery
 Mormon Cemetery
 Mount Zion Lutheran Church Memorial Garden
 Mountain Shadows Presbyterian Memorial Garden
 New Spirit Lutheran Church Columbarium
 Northminster Presbyterian Church Cemetery
 Our Saviour's Lutheran Church Memorial Garden
 Pima County Cemetery
 Presidio San Agustin del Tucson Cemetery (defunct)
 Redemptorist Renewal Center
 Rincon Cemetery
 Rincon Congregational Church Columbarium
 Saguaro Christian Church Memorial Garden
 Saint Albans Episcopal Church Columbarium
 Saint Andrews Episcopal Church Columbarium
 Saint Andrews Presbyterian Church Memorial Garden
 Saint James UMC Memorial Garden
 Saint Mark's United Methodist Church Memorial Garden
 Saint Marks Presbyterian Church Cemetery
 Saint Matthew Episcopal Church Memorial Garden
 Saint Michael and All Angels Episc. Church Garden
 Saint Pauls Memorial Garden
 Saint Philips in the Hills Church Columbarium
 San Xavier Cemetery (San Xavier Indian Reservation)
 Santa Rosa Cemetery (Santa Rosa Village, Indian Reservation)
 South Lawn Memorial Cemetery (Dignity Memorial)
 Ahmadiyya Muslim Cemetery
 Tanque Verde Lutheran Church Columbarium
 Tanque Verde Ranch Cemetery
 Thurman Ranch Burials
 Trinity Presbyterian Church Memorial Garden
 Tucson Pioneer Evergreen Cemetery
 Vista de la Montaña UMC Memorial Wall
 Twin Buttes
 Twin Buttes Cemetery (Ghost town)
 Vail
 Leon Cemetery a.k.a. Bravo-Leon Family Cemetery
 Shrine of Santa Rita
 Vail Childrens' Cemetery
 Via Rancho Del Lago Roadside Graves
 Vamori
 Vamori Villiage Cemetery (Tohono O'odham Nation Reservation)
 Ventana
 Ventana Village Cemetery (Tohono O'odham Indian Reservation)
 No associated community or town (includes wilderness areas)
 Anegam Cemetery
 Anvil Ranch Cemetery
 Binghamton LDS Cemetery
 Cerro Colorado Cemetery
 Child's Ranch Cemetery
 Edward Abbey (1927–1989) Gravesite
 E K Ranch Burial Site (Tohono O'odham Nation)
 Gamez Family Cemetery
 Haivana Nakya Cemetery
 McGee Family Cemetery
 Moreno-Escalante Family Cemetery
 Pennington Cemetery
 Ruiz Family Cemetery
 Samaniego Ranch Cemetery
 San Xavier del Bac Chapel Cemetery
 Santa Rosa Francisco Cemetery
 Sopori Ranch Cemetery
 Tappan Ranch Cemetery
 Wasp Canyon Burial
 White Mud Cemetery

Pinal

 Adamsville
 Adamsville A.O.U.W. Cemetery
 Resting place of Granville Henderson Oury (1825–1891) politician, lawyer, judge, soldier, and miner
 Ak-Chin Indian Community
 Ak-Chin Cemetery
 Apache Junction
 Goldfield Ghost Town Cemetery
 Mountain View Lutheran Church Columbarium
 Arizona City
 Coot's Chapel
 Odd Fellow's Rest
 Bapchule
 Bapchule Cemetery
 Saint Peters Cemetery
 Bates Canyon, Arizona
 Bates Canyon Cemetery
 Blackwater
 Blackwater Cemetery, a.k.a. Blackwater Westside Cemetery and West Blackwater Cemetery
 Holy Family Catholic Cemetery
 North Blackwater Cemetery
 Squawbush Cemetery
 Blake Place, Arizona
 Holyfaith Cemetery
 Butte View, Arizona
 Butte View Cemetery
 Camp Grant
 Camp Grant Massacre graves
 Casa Blanca
 Vah-Ki Cemetery, a.k.a. West Casa Blanca Cemetery
 Casa Grande
 Mountain Cemetery
 Resting place of Howard Roberts (1929–1992) jazz guitarist
 Chuichu
 Chuichu North Cemetery
 Chuichu South Cemetery
 Coolidge
 Valley Memorial Park,
 Copper Creek (Ghost town)
 Copper Creek Site
 Dudleyville
 Dudleyville Cemetery
 Eloy
 Eloy Memorial Park
 Florence
 Arizona State Prison Cemetery
 Florence Cemetery
 Globe Cemetery
 Hayden Junction/Burns Station Cemetery
 Hilltop Cemetery
 Kearney
 Kearny Memorial Cemetery
 Kelvin Cemetery
 Mammoth Cemeteries
 Mammoth Valley View Cemetery
 McKinney Cemetery, Mammoth
 Oracle
 Oracle Cemetery
 Pinal (Ghost town)
 Pinal Cemetery

 Poston Butte – Grave of Charles Debrille Poston (1825–1902)
 Ray (Ghost town)
 Ray Memorial Cemetery
 Reevis Grave
 Ripsey Wash (A-Diamond Ranch) Cemetery
 Sasco (Ghost town)
 Sasco Cemetery
 Sacaton Cemetery
 Silver King Mine (Ghost town)
 Silver King Cemetery
 South Adamsville Cemetery
 St. Ann's Cemetery
 Superior
 Fairview Cemetery
 Superior Cemetery
 Troy
 Troy Townsite Cemetery
 Vaiva Vo
 Cockleburr Cemetery
 Valley View Cemetery
 V S Ranch Cemetery
 Weaver
 Weaver Pioneer Cemetery
 No associated community or town (includes wilderness areas)
 La Osa Ranch Cemetery

Santa Cruz
 Alto
 Alto Cemetery
 Amado
 Amado Cemetery
 Calabasas
 Tellos-Ramos-Espinosa-Lopez Burial Site
 Camp Crittenden (Ghost town)
 Camp Crittenden Site
 Canelo
 Bartell Canelo Ranch Cemetery
 Black Oak Cemetery
 Duquesne
 Duquesne Cemetery
 Duquesne-Washington Camp Cemetery
 Elgin
 Elgin Cemetery
 Fruitland Cemetery, Homesteader Plot Cemetery
 Harshaw
 Harshaw Cemetery
 Harshaw Cemetery South
 Harshaw Mexican Cemetery
 Harshaw Village Cemetery
 James Nations Gravesite
 Lochiel (Ghost town)
 Enriquito de la Ossa Gravesite
 Harrison San Rafael Valley Burial Site
 Madera Canyon
 Madera Canyon Gravesites
 Whitehouse Gravesite
 Nogales
 Calabasas Cemetery
 City of Nogales Cemetery
 Ione Marcus Gordon Memorial Park
 Saint Andrews Columbarium
 Saint Joseph's Hospital Burial Grounds
 Old Glory
 California Gulch Cemetery
 Oro Blanco (Ghost town)
 Oro Blance Cemetery
 Otero
 Otero Cemetery
 Patagonia
 Cunaro Canyon Gravesite
 Gatlin Jones Cemetery
 Parker Canyon Cemetery 
 Patagonia Cemetery
 Rio Rico
 Santa Cruz School Grounds Cemetery
 Ruby (Ghost town)
 Ruby Cemetery
 Ruby Gravesites
 Scribner Cemetery

 Tubac
 Chapel of Santa Gertrudis
 Chavez Cemetery
 Salero Ranch Cemetery
 Tubac Cemetery
 Resting place of William Vann Rogers Jr. (1911–1993), politician and son of Will Rogers
 Tubac Village Cemetery
 Tumacacori
 Mission Tumacácori National Historical Park Cemetery
 Saint Josephs Cemetery
 No associated community or town (includes wilderness areas)
 El Oro Cemetery
 Lochiel
 Meigs Ranch Cemetery
 Mission Los Santos Angeles de Guevavi
 Mowry Cemetery and Orton Phelps Grave, see Mowry massacres
 Mudbank Cemetery
 Old Nogales Cemetery
 Patagonia
 Phelps Gravesite
 Smith Family Cemetery
 Watkins Family Cemetery

Yavapai
 Ashfork
 Ashfork Settlers Cemetery, a.k.a. Ash Fork Cemetery
 Bagdad
 Galena Silver Mine Camp Burial Site
 Santa Maria Cemetery, a.k.a. Ferra Cemetery, four graves of the Ferra Family
 Black Canyon City
 Albins Family Memorial Park
 Black Canyon City Municipal Memorial Park
 Bradshaw City (Ghost town)
 Bradshaw City Cemetery
 Camp Verde
 Clear Creek Cemetery
 Resting place of actors Bob “Tumbleweed” Baker and Alan Caillou
 Fort Verde Cemetery
 Middle Verde Cemetery
 Middle Verde Yavapai–Apache Cemetery (Yavapai–Apache Nation)
 Squaw Peak Cemetery
 Centerville, Arizona
 Centerville Cemetery – Abandoned
 Cherry (Ghost town)
 Cherry Cemetery (Est. 1855/1866)
 Cherry Cemetery #2
 Chino Valley
 Chino Valley Cemetery (Est. 1922)
 Del Rio Springs Cemetery
 Clarkdale
 Jerome Valley Cemetery, a.k.a. Lower Jerome Cemetery
 Saint Thomas Episcopal Church Columbarium (Church est. 1913)
 Valley View Cemetery
 Cleator (Ghost town)
 H.P. Anderson Burial Site
 Columbia, (Ghost town)
 Congress (Ghost town)
 Congress Cemetery (Est. 1887)
 Congress Gravesite (William Miller & dog)
 Williams Ranch Cemetery
 Constellation
 Constellation Cemetery
 Copperopolis
 Copperopolis Cemetery
 Cordes (Ghost town)
 Cordes Cemetery
 Cornville
 Copple – Hayden Cemetery
 Thompson Family Cemetery
 Cottonwood
 All Souls Cemetery (Est. 2004)
 Azteca Cemetery, a.k.a. Azteca Lodge Cemetery & Lopez Delfina Etal Dba Cemetery
 Cottonwood Cemeteries (East and West) – historic cemetery is dated 1878–1938
 Jerome Mine Laborers Cemetery
 Crown King (Ghost town)
 Bishop Family Cemetery
 Crown King Cemetery
 Kentuck Ranch Burial Site (Kentucks Grave)
 Palace Station Cemetery
 Dead Horse Ranch State Park – Cemetery
 Dewey
 Dewey Cemetery
 Henderson Cemetery
 Heritage Memorial Park, a.k.a. Redwood Memorial Gardens
 Includes Temple Brith Shalom section
 May Family Memorials
 Drake
 Cedar Glade Cemetery
 Drake Cemetery
 Dugas
 Dugas Cemetery
 Fort Misery  (Ghost town)
 George Washington Mine Graves
 Gilbert
 Gilbert Cemetery – burials are documented but no grave exist
 Gillette (Ghost town)
 Gillette Cemetery
 Granite Dells
 Boblitt Cemetery
 Wilkinson Family Cemetery
 Harshaw, two cemeteries near the abandoned town
 Howells, ghost town with cemetery
 Humboldt
 Henderson Cemetery
 Humboldt Cemetery
 Humbug (Ghost town)
 Humbug Cemetery near the mining town
 Champie Ranch Cemetery, a.k.a. Castle Hot Springs Cemetery
 Jerome
 Jerome Cemetery, a.k.a., Hogback Cemetery
 Laura Williams Memorial Park
 Mescal Gulch Cemetery
 Kirkland
 Kirkland Cemetery, a.k.a. Kirkland Pioneer Cemetery
 Owens Family Ranch Cemetery
 Rynearson Family Cemetery
 Lapham, ghost town with unkempt graves nearby.
 Mayer (Ghost town)
 Mayer Cemetery
 Todd Ranch Cemetery
 McCabe, ghost town near Humboldt (Ghost town)
 McCabe Cemetery, a.k.a. Miner's Union Cemetery and Spud Mountain Cemetery
 Middelton, former mining town for the De Soto Mine, situated along the Bradshaw Mountain Railroad, scattered cemetery graves remain
 Miller Valley (near Prescott)
 Miller Valley Cemetery, a.k.a. Ritter Cemetery, Simmons Cemetery
 Minnehaha, scattered graves
 Tussock Spring Cemetery/Gravesite
 Monte Cristo Mine Cemeteries (Upper and Lower), Constellation Road to Wickenburg
 Nelson
 Nelson Cemetery, a.k.a. Nelson Memorial Cemetery
 Oak Creek
 Cornville Cemetery
 Octave (Ghost town) (near Weaver)
 Moralez Ranch Family Cemetery
 Octave Cemetery
 Weaver Cemetery – ghost town
 Paulden
 Colonel Jeff Cooper Burial Site
 Puntenney Pioneer Cemetery, a.k.a. Cedar Glade
 Paxton Place, near Walnut Grove
 Walnut Grove Cemetery – ghost town
 Peeples Valley
 Genung Memorial Park Cemetery, a.k.a. Peeples Valley Pioneer Cemetery, Yarnell Pioneer Cemetery
 Perkinsville (Ghost town)
 Perkinsville Cemetery
 Poland Junction
 Masse Ranch Cemetery (1946)

 Prescott has multiple cemeteries, including:
 All Saints Anglican Church Columbarium
 Allred Family Cemetery
 American Lutheran Church Memorial Garden
 Arizona Pioneers' Home Cemetery, a.k.a. Simmons Cemetery
 It is the resting place for numerous historic and modern figures
 Beatty Family Graveyard, Prescott
 Boblett Cemetery
 Camp Date Creek, a.k.a. Fort McPherson, Cemetery, military cemetery – while many internments were relocated visible gravesites remain.
 Citizens Cemetery, Prescott Armory Historic District
 Resting place of Harley High Cartter (1810–1874) jurist
 Ferguson-Morrell Cemetery
 First Lutheran Church Memorial Garden
 I.O.O.F. Cemetery
 Resting place of Lewis Wolfley (1839–1910) civil engineer and Governor of Arizona Territory
 Joseph Le Roy Hamblin Gravesite
 Masonic Cemetery, a.k.a. Aztlan Lodge Masonic Cemetery
 Resting place of Morris Goldwater (1852–1939) businessman and politician
 Memorial Park
 Resting place of Pete Schrum (1934–2003) character actor
 Mountain View Cemetery
 Resting place of the following:
 Henry F. Ashurst (1874–1962) one of the first two Senators from Arizona
 John G. Campbell (1827–1903) Scottish-born American businessman and politician
 Thomas E. Campbell (1878–1944) second state governor
 Dorothy Fay, a.k.a. Dorothy Ritter, (1915–2003) actress in Western films
 Ana Frohmiller (1891–1971) politician
 Richard Longstreet Tea (1840–1911) recipient of the Medal of Honor during the Indian Wars
 John F. Wilson (1846–1911) Territory of Arizona politician
 Prescott Cemetery, Prescott
 Prescott National Cemetery a.k.a. Fort Whipple Cemetery
 Resting place of Nicholas Foran, recipient of the Medal of Honor
 Resting place of Jim Pike, lead singer with The Lettermen
 Prescott United Methodist Church Columbarium
 Rolling Hills Cemetery, Prescott, closed cemetery
 Saint Lukes Columbarium
 Sharlot Hall Museum Grounds
 Mountain man Pauline Weaver was buried here
 Shepherd of the Hills Lutheran Church Columbarium
 Trinity Presbyterian Church Cemetery
 Yavapai County Cemetery (Ainsworth Street), next to the Mountain View Cemetery of Prescott
 Yavapain County Cemetery (Iron Springs Road)
 Yavapai-Prescott Tribe
 Prescott Valley
 Angeline Hoagland Gravesite
 Prescott Valley Arizona Moose Memorial Grounds
 Rimrock
 Casner Family Cemetery
 Sayers Spring, a.k.a. Sayers Station and Sayersville – near Gilbert – abandoned buildings and grave markers
 Sedona
 Cooks Cedar Glade Cemetery (1918) (City of Sedona Landmark No. 12)
 Saint Andrew's Episcopal Church Columbarium
 Sedona Community Cemetery
 Schuerman Red Rock Cemetery (1893)
 Seligman
 Seligman Public Cemetery
 Shelley, abandoned buildings with nearby graves
 Signal (Ghost town)
 Skull Valley
 Christopherson Cemetery
 Old Skull Valley Cemetery
 Skull Valley Cemetery
 Stanton (Ghost town)
 Moralez Cemetery
 Stanton Cemetery
 Sycamore Creek, contains scattered graves
 Tip Top (Ghost town)
 Venezia (Ghost town)
 Wagoner (Ghost town)
 Gravesite of Captain James Clark Hunt (died 1890)
 Walker
 Bykerk Graves, nearby interred cremated remains
 Walnut Creek
 Walnut Creek Cemetery
 White Hills
 White Hills Pioneer Cemetery.
 White Picacho Mountain – graves
 Williamson Valley, Arizona
 Las Vegas Ranch Cemetery, a.k.a. Granite Mountain Cemetery, Pierce Cemetery, Williamson Valley Cemetery
 No associated community or town (includes wilderness areas)
 Arcosanti Cemetery
 Aultman Cemetery
 Beaver Creek Baptist Church Cemetery
 Beck's Quiet Place Cemetery
 Bradshaw Spring Gravesite
 Camp Wood/Camp Hualpai Post Cemetery (dating from the Hualapai War
 Champie Mill Cemetery, a.k.a. Allen's Mill Cemetery
 Champie Ranch Cemetery, a.k.a. Castle Hot Springs Cemetery
 Clarkdale Indian Cemetery
 Deacon Family Cemetery
 Fort Hualapai Cemetery
 Goodwin Site
 Gleed Cemetery
 Gold Basin Cemetery, abandoned mining area north of Kingman
 Gunung Cemetery
 Guttry Gravesite Cemetery
 Hassayampa River – Leonardo Cordova grave, plus others
 Hillside Cemetery
 Hualapai Cemetery (Shook, Scholey, Rodgers)
 Isaac Bradshaw Gravesite (1885)
 James Waters Burial Place
 Mescal Gulch, near Mescal Spring, three graves remain
 Myrtle Irene Thomas Gravesite
 Nellis Burial Ground
 Pantano Cemetery
 Pica Cemetery
 Red Rock/Schuerman Cemetery
 Redwood–Heritage Cemetery
 Seventysix Mine
 Sixby Ranch Cemetery
 Slim Jim Creek graves
 Stoddard Gravesite
 Thompson Valley Cemetery
 Weaver Mine Cemetery
 Walker Gravesite

Yuma
 Dome
 Dome Valley Cemetery and Gila City
 Laguna
 Laguna Cemetery, Laguna Dam, northwest of Yuma
 Mohawk
 Robert Carpenter Burial Site
 Roll
 Butterfield Stage Station Burial Sitef
 Somerton
 Cocopah Indian Reservation Cemeteries (East and West)
 Wellton
 Wellton Memorial Cemetery
 Yuma
 Christ Lutheran Church Columbarium
 Desert Lawn Memorial Park, a.k.a. Yuma Cemetery
 Faith Lutheran Church Columbarium
 Gloria de Cristo Lutheran Church Columbarium
 Saint John Neumann Catholic Church Columbarium
 Saint Pauls Episcopal Church Columbarium
 Sunset Vista Funeral Home & Cemetery
 Tribal Burial Ground
 Trinity United Methodist Church Columbarium
 Yuma Pioneer Cemetery, a.k.a. Old Yuma Cemetery & Yuma City Cemetery, which holds the grave of Arizona pioneer Jack Swilling
 Yuma County Cemetery (includes re-internments from Immaculate Conception)
 Yuma Territorial Prison
 No associated community or town (includes wilderness areas)
 Agua Caliente Cemetery, near Camp Hyder
 Bouse Cemetery
 Camino Del Diablo Gravesites 1 and 2
 Castle Dome Landing (site)
 Cibola Cemetery
 Colorado Mine & Cemetery, Castle Dome Mountains
 Dave O'Neill Gravesite
 Dome Cemetery, a.k.a. Gila City Cemetery
 Fort Yuma Cemetery (graves removed to Presidio)
 Hovatter Graves Site, Little Horn Mountains
 Kofa and Polaris – KOFA Cemetery
 Martinez Lake Road Cemetery
 North Gila Valley Cemetery
 Oglby Cemetery
 Potholes Cemetery
 Quartzsite Episcopal Cemetery

See also

 Cochise County in the Old West
 List of cemeteries in the United States
 List of census-designated places in Arizona
 List of counties in Arizona
 List of ghost towns in Arizona
 List of Indian reservations in Arizona

Footnotes

References

 Arizona Gravestone Photo Project
 Known Burial Sites in Arizona, azhistcemeteries.org

Further reading

External links

 AMP – Arizona Memory Project (Arizona State Archives & History)
 Pioneers' Cemetery Association
 Arizona Cemetery Records at Interment.net website

 usgennet.org Arizona website searchpage
 My Free Cemetery Records – Arizona Cemeteries
 I Dream of Genealogy – Arizona Cemetery Grave Listings
 
 The Cemetery Detective – Information on various cemeteries, US and elsewhere

Cemeteries
Arizona
Cemeteries